Bruce Davey is an Australian film producer.

A partner in Icon Entertainment alongside Mel Gibson, Sydney-born Davey has produced many films including Apocalypto, The Passion of the Christ, Push, and Braveheart for which he won an Academy Award for Best Picture. Davey began as Gibson's CPA after being recommended by Gibson's running coach in Gallipoli. After becoming Gibson's business manager, the two men founded Icon Productions in 1989.

Filmography
He was a producer in all films unless otherwise noted.

Film

As an actor

Music department

Television

References

External links

Australian film producers
Year of birth missing (living people)
Living people
Producers who won the Best Picture Academy Award
American independent film production company founders